The 1942 season was the Chicago Bears' 23rd in the National Football League.  The team improved on their 10–1 record in 1941 and finished at 11–0, under head coach George Halas (who left for World War II in November) and temporary co-coaches Hunk Anderson and Luke Johnsos. The Bears were denied a three-peat and an undefeated season when they lost to the Washington Redskins in the year's title game. In the previous two NFL championship games, the Bears defeated the Redskins, 73–0, and then the Giants, 37–9.

The 1942 Bears were "the single most dominant team in the history of the NFL," according to Cold Hard Football Facts. "The 1942 Bears went 11–0, scored 376 points and surrendered just 84 points. That dominant team, like the undefeated 2007 Patriots, was upset in the NFL championship game."

Schedule

Postseason

Standings

References

Chicago Bears
Chicago Bears seasons
Chicago Bears